The Europe and Africa Zone is one of the three zones of regional Davis Cup competition in 2014.

In the Europe and Africa Zone there are four different groups in which teams compete against each other to advance to the next group.

Participating teams

Seeds:

Remaining nations:

Draw

 and  promoted to Group I in 2015.

First round

South Africa vs. Monaco

Norway vs. Lithuania

Finland vs. Bulgaria

Bosnia and Herzegovina vs. Greece

Belarus vs. Ireland

Moldova vs. Egypt

Morocco vs. Luxembourg

Denmark vs. Cyprus

Second round

South Africa vs. Lithuania

Finland vs. Bosnia and Herzegovina

Moldova vs. Belarus

Denmark vs. Luxembourg

Play-offs

Norway vs. Monaco

Greece vs. Bulgaria

Ireland vs. Egypt

Morocco vs. Cyprus

Third round

Bosnia and Herzegovina vs. Lithuania

Denmark vs. Moldova

References

External links
Draw Results

Europe Africa Zone II